The 1946 Wichita Shockers football team, sometimes known as the Wheatshockers, was an American football team that represented the Wichita  University (now known as Wichita State University) as a member of the Missouri Valley Conference during the 1946 college football season. In its second season under head coach Ralph Graham, the team compiled a 5–5 record (2–1 against conference opponents), finished second out of five teams in the MVC, and was outscored opponents by a total of 135 to 119. The team played its home games at Veterans Field, now known as Cessna Stadium. The 1946 season was the first for Wichita after being classified as a "major college" football program.

Schedule

References

Wichita
Wichita State Shockers football seasons
Wichita Shockers football